The discography of the Serbian alternative rock band Block Out comprises four studio albums, two live albums, one video album, five singles, and fifteen music videos.

The band released their debut album, Crno, belo i srebrno in 1993, after the release of the compact cassette Live KST, Akademija, also released in 1993. With the release of the band's second studio album, Godina sirotinjske zabave, the band abolished the early hard rock concept, and turned towards grunge. However, it was on the follow-up, San koji srećan sanjaš sam, that the band found their own musical style and expression, an artistically oriented alternative rock, captured live on the three volume live album Između dva zla, also found on the fourth studio album Ako imaš s kim i gde, released in 2004. In 2007, the band released the self-titled DVD featuring the live recording of the 2005 Belgrade Dom Omladine performance, and all the music videos the band had made throughout their career. At the moment, the band is preparing a new studio album.

Studio albums

Live albums

Singles

Various artists compilation appearances

Tribute album appearances

Video albums

Music videos

External links 
 EX YU ROCK enciklopedija 1960-2006,  Janjatović Petar;  
  Block Out at Discogs

Discographies of Serbian artists
Rock music group discographies